Dysdera aberrans is a spider species found in Italy.

See also 
 List of Dysderidae species

References 

Dysderidae
Fauna of Italy
Spiders of Europe
Spiders described in 2010